Levelfilm, stylized as levelFILM, is a Canadian film distribution company based in Toronto, Ontario. The company was founded by David Hudakoc and Michael Baker in 2013, and later acquired two other Canadian distribution houses: Search Engine Films in 2018 and KinoSmith in 2021. It has released more than 200 titles, with a focus on independent Canadian films.

History 

levelFILM was founded by Michael Baker and David Hudakoc in August 2013, who had previously worked together at the U.S. distribution house ThinkFilm. The company's first acquisition, Chen Kaige's Caught in the Web, was announced along with the company's creation.

In 2017, the company sold a majority stake to Laurie Venning, a Canadian investor, entrepreneur, and producer.

At the 2018 Berlin Film Festival levelFILM announced its acquisition of another Canadian distributor, Search Engine Films (SEF). John Bain, the head of SEF at the time, joined as the company's new Head of Distribution. SEF's library was folded into levelFILM's existing catalogue, including titles such as Equals, Kilo Two Bravo, and Mary Shelley.

In 2019, it was announced that levelFILM and U.S.-based distributor Good Deed Entertainment had struck a four-year output deal, ending in 2023.

At the 2021 Toronto International Film Festival levelFILM announced a multi-year output deal with the U.S. company Greenwich Entertainment, beginning with The Capote Tapes. Later in the fall, levelFILM acquired KinoSmith, and folded in its CEO, Robin Smith, as the new Head of Factual. Simultaneously, the company partnered with Smith's other venture, the documentary financing and distribution house Blue Ice Docs, a subsidiary of the Blue Ice Group.

In April 2022 the company was listed at number 9 in The Globe and Mail's list of the 22 most influential people in the Canadian film industry.

During the 2022 Toronto International Film Festival levelFILM signed an exclusive output deal with Bleecker Street. Mafia Mamma, directed by Catherine Hardwicke, is set to be the first release of the deal and is scheduled for April 2023.

In October 2022, levelFILM released Eternal Spring, which was selected to be Canada's official submission to the 95th Academy Awards for the Best International Feature Film category. The film was also eligible for Best Documentary and Best Animated Feature, but did not make the shortlist in either category.

Released Films

References

External links
 

Film distributors of Canada
Companies based in Toronto
2013 establishments in Ontario
Entertainment companies established in 2013